Metro Inc. is a Canadian food retailer operating in the provinces of Quebec and Ontario. The company is based in Montreal, Quebec with head office at 11011 Boulevard Maurice-Duplessis. Metro is the third largest grocer in Canada, after Loblaw Companies Limited and Sobeys.

There are 365 namesake locations in Ontario and Quebec. Super C
is the discount supermarket division operated in Quebec with 72 stores, averaging . These stores contribute to C$1 billion of Metro's annual sales. In Ontario, Metro has 139 discount supermarkets under the Food Basics banner, which are very similar to the Super C stores. Large Metro stores in Quebec operate under the Metro Plus name. Metro also operates 142 small groceries under the Marché Richelieu banner.

In November 2007, Metro reported a 9.3% increase in earnings for the fiscal year ending September 29, 2007, making $276.6 million in 2007 compared to $253 million in 2006. In 2011 Metro acquired a majority stake (55.5%) (CAD$153.8 million) in Marché Adonis, one of Quebec's biggest ethnic food retailers specializing in Mediterranean food (Marché Adonis sales CAD$73 million 2011). In a March 2020 press release, Metro announced that it will invest about $420 million within next 5 years for the construction of a new automated distribution centre for fresh and frozen products, which they hope to open in 2023.

History
The company was founded in 1947 in Verdun, Quebec by Rolland Jeanneau. Many independent grocery stores joined the company to form Magasins Lasalle Stores Ltée. In 1952, Magasins Lasalles Stores Ltée change its name to Épiceries Lasalle Groceteria. The company had 43 affiliated grocery stores at the time. In 1955, they were 50 franchised stores and the company with a revenue of $2 million. The company gained fame in 1956 through an advertisement in La Presse which showed turkeys sold for 39 cents. That year, mayor Jean Drapeau was already talking about implementing in Montreal a rapid transit system to be called the Montreal Metro. This inspired the company to create a division called Metro. Other grocery stores joined the company bringing its number of stores to 73 in 1957 with revenue of $10 million.

Because of the success of the Metro division, the company renamed itself Metro-Lasalle in 1963. In 1972, Metro-Lasalle changed its name to Metro-Ltée. Metro merged with the Marché Richelieu grocery chain in 1975 to become Groupe Metro-Richelieu Inc in 1976.

In the early 1980s, Metro went through harder times due to fierce competition from Provigo and the recession. Metro merged with Epiciers Unis Inc. and took on the name Metro-Richelieu Inc. (dropping the "Groupe" from its name). During the rest of the 1980s, it fared better and entered the Montreal Stock Exchange in 1986.

Metro suffered from the early 1990s recession. A restructuring plan was established and changes were brought in the management team. Metro acquired 48 of 112 Steinberg supermarkets when that company went bankrupt in 1992. These stores were rebranded as Super C and Metro stores. Metro entered the Toronto Stock Exchange in 1993. It acquired Loeb Stores from Loblaws in 1999. The Metro Plus banner was established in the early 2000s. Some of the stores were converted to Super C, while others continued to operate as Loeb. The Super C stores in Ontario were converted to Food Basics. In 2009, the company converted all Loeb stores to Metro.

Mergers and acquisitions 
On July 19, 2005, Metro, Inc. announced that it had reached an agreement with The Great Atlantic & Pacific Tea Company, Inc. and its subsidiary, A&P Luxembourg S.à.r.l., to acquire all of the issued and outstanding common shares of A&P Canada, for an acquisition price of $1.7 billion, consisting of $1.2 billion in cash and $500 million in the form of treasury shares of Metro. The purchase was completed on August 15, 2005, and after beating out Sobeys in a bidding war, Metro now has a network in Quebec and Ontario of 573 conventional and discount food stores, and 256 pharmacies.

On August 7, 2008, Metro announced it would invest $200 million consolidating the company's conventional food stores under the Metro banner. Over a period of 15 months, all Dominion, A&P, Loeb, the Barn, and Ultra Food & Drug banners were converted to the Metro name. Food Basics stores were not affected as it competes in the discount food segment. Metro now holds the second largest market share in the food distribution and retailing business in Quebec and Ontario with nearly $11 billion in sales and more than 65,000 employees. Its stores operate under the banners Metro, Metro Plus, Super C, Food Basics, Marché Ami, Les 5 Saisons and Marché Adonis. Its pharmacies operate under the banners Brunet, The Pharmacy, Clini-Plus, and Drug Basics.

In 2017, Metro acquired Canadian meal kit service, Miss Fresh.

In May 2018, Metro closed a $4.5 billion (CAD) acquisition of the Quebec drug chain Jean Coutu Group, making it one of Canada’s largest retailers and distributors of food and drugs.

Loyalty programs
Stores under the Metro and Metro Plus banners offer one of the following loyalty programs:
 Stores in Ontario, excluding those in Thunder Bay, participate in the Air Miles program. Customers earn 1 reward mile for every $20 spent cumulatively each week (Sunday to Saturday). Points may be redeemed for a variety of items, including in-store grocery redemptions (95 miles can be redeemed for $10 in groceries). 
 Due to Metro's Ontario stores (then A&P Canada) joining Air Miles after Safeway, which has locations in Thunder Bay, Metro's locations in that city have their own loyalty program called Thunder Bucks. Similar to Air Miles, customers earn 1 Thunder Point for every $20 spent, and bonus-points promotions are generally equivalent to those offered for Air Miles in the rest of the province. However, points are automatically redeemed for gift certificates at the rate of 125 points per $20 gift certificate.
 For similar reasons (Air Miles has a partnership with Sobeys/IGA in Quebec), locations in Quebec have their own program, metro&moi (Metro and Me). Customers earn 1 point for every $1 spent; points are automatically converted to rewards vouchers which are mailed every three months at a rate of $1 per 125 points accumulated (with a minimum balance of 500 points required for vouchers to be mailed).

In spring 2015, Metro agreed to drop its exclusivity on the Air Miles program in Ontario; as a result, Sobeys stores throughout that province now offer Air Miles rewards in parallel with Metro. However, Sobeys (which now also owns Safeway Canada) did not reciprocate, and Metro continues to be unable to offer Air Miles in either Quebec or Thunder Bay.

Corporate governance
Members of the board of directors of Metro Inc. are: Réal Raymond (Chair), Marc Guay (Administrateur), Maryse Bertrand, François J. Coutu, Michel Coutu, Stephanie Coyles, Marc DeSerres, Claude Dussault, Russell Goodman, Christian W.E. Haub, Eric R. La Flèche, Christine Magee, Marie-José Nadeau, and Line Rivard.

Locations

 Metro stores listed below, particularly in Quebec, include independently owned and operated stores that franchised the Metro name and concept.

Ontario
128 locations:

 Ajax
 Arnprior
 Aurora
 Barrie
 Barry's Bay
 Belleville
 Bowmanville
 Brampton (4)
 Brantford
 Brockville
 Burlington
 Casselman
 Cobourg
 Collingwood
 Gananoque
 Georgetown
 Guelph
 Hamilton (5)
 Huntsville
 Kingston (3)
 London (5)
 Milton
 Mississauga (6)
 Napanee
 Newmarket (2)
 North Bay
 Oakville (3)
 Orangeville
 Orillia
 Oshawa
 Ottawa (17)
 Owen Sound
 Pembroke
 Perth
 Peterborough
 Pickering
 Picton
 Renfrew
 Sarnia (2)
 Sault Ste. Marie (3)
 Stouffville
 St. Catharines
 St. Thomas
 Sturgeon Falls
 Sudbury
 Thunder Bay (3)
 Tillsonburg
 Timmins 
 Toronto (17)
 Trenton
 Val Caron
 Whitby (3)
 Windsor (4)

Quebec
130 Metro locations:

 Alma (2)
 Ancienne-Lorette
 Bedford
 Beloeil
 Bois-des-Filion
 Boucherville (2)
 Brossard (2)
 Carleton-sur-Mer
 Chandler
 Charlemagne
 Charny
 Chénéville
 Degelis
 Deschaillons-sur-Saint-Laurent
 Donnacona
 Drummondville
 Farnham
 Fermont
 Fort-Coulonge
 Gatineau (2)
 Gracefield
 Granby
 Henryville
 L'Épiphanie
 L'Île-Perrot
 La Malbaie
 Lac-Etchemin
 Lac-Mégantic
 Lachute
 Laurier-Station
 Laval (2)
 Lévis
 Longueuil (3)
 Maniwaki
 Marieville
 Mont-Laurier
 Mont-Saint-Hilaire
 Mont-Tremblant
 Montmagny
 Montreal (20)
 Mount Royal
 Napierville
 Nicolet
 Oka
 Papineauville
 Pierreville
 Pincourt
 Quebec City (11)
 Repentigny
 Rigaud
 Rimouski
 Rosemère
 Saguenay (2)
 Saint-Alphonse-Rodriguez
 Saint-André-Avellin
 Saint-Césaire
 Saint-Chrysostome
 Saint-Damien-de-Brandon
 Saint-Donat
 Saint-Félicien
 Saint-Gabriel-de-Brandon
 Saint-Georges (2)
 Saint-Jean-Baptiste
 Saint-Jean-de-Matha
 Saint-Marc-des-Carrières
 Saint-Raymond
 Saint-Sauveur
 Saint-Tite-de-Champlain 
 Sainte-Anne-des-Monts
 Sainte-Anne-de-la-Pérade
 Sainte-Anne-des-Plaines
 Sainte-Claire
 Sainte-Croix
 Sainte-Julie
 Sainte-Madeleine
 Sainte-Mélanie
 Salaberry-de-Valleyfield
 Shawinigan
 Sherbrooke
 Terrebonne (3)
 Thetford Mines
 Thurso
 Trois-Rivières (2)
 Val-David
 Verchères
 Waterloo
 Westmount
 Windsor

89 Metro Plus locations:

 Beaconsfield
 Bécancour
 Beloeil
 Blainville
 Boisbriand
 Bromont
 Brossard (2)
 Candiac
 Chambly
 Châteauguay
 Dolbeau-Mistassini
 Drummondville
 Gatineau (4)
 Joliette
 Kirkland
 La Pocatière
 Laval (6)
 Lévis (3)
 Longueuil (2)
 Louiseville
 Magog
 Mascouche
 Montreal (14)
 Notre-Dame-de-l'Île-Perrot
 Pointe-Claire
 Quebec City (8)
 Rawdon
 Repentigny
 Saguenay (2)
 Saint-Augustin-de-Desmaures (2)
 Sainte-Catherine
 Saint-Charles-Borromée
 Saint-Constant
 Saint-Eustache (2)
 Saint-Hyacinthe
 Saint-Jérôme (2)
 Saint-Zotique
 Sainte-Adèle
 Sainte-Agathe-des-Monts
 Sainte-Julienne
 Sainte-Marie
 Sainte-Marthe-sur-le-Lac
 Sainte-Thérèse
 Salaberry-de-Valleyfield
 Sherbrooke (2)
 Sorel-Tracy
 Saint-Félix-de-Valois
 Terrebonne (2)
 Trois-Rivières (2)
 Val-des-Sources
 Victoriaville

220 total

In-store brands

 "Selection": regular store brand, generic products, at an affordable price
 "Irresistibles": high quality and exclusive store brand products at a competitive price
"Personnelle": pharmacy, health, and personal care products
“Life Smart”: Snacks,small food items, etc

See also

 List of supermarket chains in Canada
 Food Basics
 Super C

References

External links

 Official website
 SEDAR company profile

 
Companies listed on the Toronto Stock Exchange
Companies based in Montreal
Retail companies established in 1947
Supermarkets of Canada
Canadian brands
1947 establishments in Quebec
S&P/TSX 60
Online grocers
Online retailers of Canada